Mount Buller is a mountain in the Victorian Alps of the Great Dividing Range, located in the Australian state of Victoria.

Toponym
The British explorer and surveyor Major Sir Thomas Livingstone Mitchell named the mountain after an acquaintance in the Colonial Office, Charles Buller. The Aboriginal name for the mountain is Bulla Bulla meaning "good".

Geography

The summit of Buller can be approached by vehicle via the village coupled with a short 500 metre (1600 foot) walk. It is also possible to climb the peak from Delatite River level along the Klingsporn walking track. The Klingsporn track was originally a bridle trail used by stockmen taking their cattle up to high ground during the summer months. 

The walk begins at Merimbah and is a  walk on a well defined track. Mclaughlin Spur offers good views to the summit fire tower and the rocky outcrops that must be traversed. At the summit there is a stone distance dial and a fire tower that is staffed during the summer months.

Climate
Mount Buller has a hemiboreal climate. Under the Köppen climate classification scheme, it has a Subpolar oceanic climate (Köppen: Cfc) with cool summers and cold, very snowy winters. On average, Mount Buller receives 67.6 snowy days annually, the greatest figure for any mainland Australian site.

Resort
The Mount Buller Alpine Resort is a popular destination in winter for skiers and snowboarders of all abilities who wish to attend for the day. With it only being a 3 hour drive, it is the nearest major downhill ski resort to Melbourne. In the warmer months, it provides a base for day visitors and hikers in the Victorian Alps.

Gallery

See also

Alpine National Park
List of mountains in Victoria

References

External links

 
 

Buller
Victorian Alps
Unincorporated areas of Victoria (Australia)